KWC may refer to:

Karaoke World Championships, a song contest and talent show
Kentucky Wesleyan College, a private Methodist college in Owensboro, Kentucky
Tri-Cities (Ontario), a tri-city area in Ontario, Canada that encompasses Kitchener, Waterloo and Cambridge
King William's College, a school in Castletown, Isle of Man
Kowloon Walled City, a former enclave of Hong Kong
Kyocera Wireless Corporation, a manufacturer of mobile phones